Ethiopian national under-20 football team, also known as Ethiopia Under-20 or Ethiopia U20 (Amharic:ከ 20 ዓመት በታች የወንዶች እግር ኳስ ብሔራዊ ቡድን), represents Ethiopia in association football at an under-20 age level and is controlled by Ethiopian Football Federation, the governing body for football in Ethiopia. The current coach is Atinafu Alemu

Current squad
 The following players were called up for the 2022 CECAFA U-20 Championship.
 Match dates: 28 October – 11 November 2022
Caps and goals correct as of: 5 November 2022, after the match against

Honours
CECAFA U-20 Championship:
Winners (3): 1995, 1996, 2005

References

Under-20
African national under-20 association football teams
Football in Ethiopia
Youth in Ethiopia